Equine arterivirus serine peptidase is an enzyme. This enzyme catalyses the following chemical reaction

 Cleavage of (Glu/Gln)-(Gly/Ser/Ala) in arterivirus replicase translation products ORF1a and ORF1ab

In the equine arterivirus (EAV), the replicase gene is translated into open reading frame 1a (ORF1a) and ORF1ab [polyprotein]s.

References

External links 
 

EC 3.4.21
Arteriviridae